Libro Credit Union, Libro, or Libro Credit Union Limited, is a credit union based in London, Ontario, Canada. Libro is owned by its customers, who direct the institution's decisions. Libro offers many financial services, including chequing and savings accounts, loans, mortgages, investments, financial coaching and advice for consumers and farm and business owners. Deposits are insured by the Financial Services Regulatory Authority of Ontario (FSRA).

Libro was founded in 1951 by the Dutch Catholic immigrants in the Diocese of London, who sponsored Theodore J. Smeenk to immigrate to London and seconded him to establish it. In 1953 the name was changed to St. Willibrord Community Credit Union and to Libro Financial Group in 2006. The credit union has grown and expanded across Southwestern Ontario through mergers with other credit unions in London, Blenheim, Kitchener-Waterloo, St. Thomas and Wingham.

Libro has over 103,000 members and $4.2 billion in assets under administration.{December 2017} There are 660 employees at 31 branches across southwestern Ontario and at the administration office in London, Ontario. Jack Smit was president and CEO from 1988 to 2012. He was also the chair of the Central 1 board of directors. Jack announced in August 2011 that he would retire on January 31, 2012. Stephen Bolton accepted the position of president and CEO, head coach on February 1, 2012.

In 2007, Libro was awarded "Business of the Year" by the London Chamber of Commerce. In 2010 Libro was awarded the "Quality Award" by the London Chamber of Commerce. Libro is the "bank" in the I Luv London edition of Monopoly.

On June 4, 2010, Libro launched Young & Free Ontario  with United Communities Credit Union.

In June 2013 Libro and United Communities Credit Union announced their intent to combine operations. On January 1, 2014, the two credit unions amalgamated. On January 1, the Kellogg Employee Credit Union announced that it would join Libro as of March 31, following the closure of the Kellogg cereal plant in London.  In 2015 Hald-Nor Credit Union joined Libro with four branches in Haldimand and Norfolk counties.

References

External links
 Libro Credit Union

Companies based in London, Ontario
Banks established in 1951
Canadian companies established in 1951
Credit unions of Ontario
1951 establishments in Ontario